Yuriy Habovda (born 6 May 1989) is a professional Ukrainian football midfielder.

Career
Habovda made his debut for FC Karpaty Lviv entering as a second-half substitute against FC Dynamo Kyiv on 24 April 2010 in Ukrainian Premier League.

References

External links

1989 births
Living people
People from Mukachevo
Ukrainian people of Hungarian descent
Ukrainian footballers
Association football midfielders
FC Karpaty Lviv players
FC Karpaty-2 Lviv players
FC Kryvbas Kryvyi Rih players
SC Tavriya Simferopol players
FC Granit Mikashevichi players
FC Dinamo Minsk players
FC Rukh Lviv players
Balmazújvárosi FC players
Szombathelyi Haladás footballers
Debreceni VSC players
FC Torpedo-BelAZ Zhodino players
FK Dukla Prague players
Ukrainian Premier League players
Belarusian Premier League players
Nemzeti Bajnokság I players
Ukrainian expatriate footballers
Expatriate footballers in Belarus
Ukrainian expatriate sportspeople in Belarus
Expatriate footballers in Hungary
Ukrainian expatriate sportspeople in Hungary
Expatriate footballers in the Czech Republic
Sportspeople from Zakarpattia Oblast
Czech National Football League players